The Balanced Budget Amendment Task Force is a conservative Florida-based lobbying organization supporting a balanced-budget amendment to the United States Constitution. 

The group advocates an Article V convention to include such an amendment.  An Article V convention is convened at the request of two-thirds of the states. Twenty-seven have made the request. Thirty-four are needed and then thirty-eight states would be needed for ratification of any proposed amendments.

States requesting a convention

 Alabama
 Alaska
 Arizona
 Arkansas
 Florida
 Georgia
 Indiana
 Iowa
 Kansas
 Louisiana
 Michigan
 Mississippi
 Missouri
 Nebraska
 New Hampshire
 North Carolina
 North Dakota
 Ohio
 Oklahoma
 Pennsylvania
 South Dakota
 Tennessee
 Texas
 Utah
 West Virginia
 Wisconsin
 Wyoming

States rejecting a convention
 Colorado
 Delaware
 Maryland
 Nevada
 New Mexico

References

Proposed amendments to the United States Constitution
United States federal budgets